This is a listing of illuminated manuscripts produced between 900 and 1066 in Anglo-Saxon monasteries, or by Anglo-Saxon scribes or illuminators working in continental scriptoria.  This list includes manuscripts in Latin and Anglo-Saxon.  For manuscripts produced before 900 see the List of Hiberno-Saxon illuminated manuscripts.

The invasions during the reign of King Alfred the Great created a disruption in the manuscript production in England.  When manuscript production resumed in the later portion of Alfred's reign, a break with the previous Insular style of manuscript illumination occurred.  The new style, although drawing some elements from Insular manuscripts, also was influenced by Carolingian, Byzantine, and Mediterranean traditions.  The Norman Conquest produced another break in English manuscript production which ended the Anglo-Saxon tradition of manuscript illumination. For more information see Anglo-Saxon art.

Listing
This listing includes every surviving manuscript with Anglo-Saxon miniatures, drawings, or other major decoration.  It also includes a representative sample of manuscripts with Anglo-Saxon pen-work initials.  The manuscripts are sorted by their current location. 
Besançon
Bibliothèque Municipale
MS 14; Gospel Book, 10th and 11th century
Boulogne
Bibliothèque Municipale
MS 10; Gospels, 10th century
MS 11; Boulogne Gospels, 10th century
MS 82; Amalarius, De ecclesiasticis officiis, 10th century
MS 189; Prudentius, Carmina and Miscellanea, 11th century
Cambridge
Corpus Christi College
MS 23; Prudentius, Psychomachia and other poems, 10th century
MS 41; Bede, Historia ecclesiastica, 11th century
MS 57; Miscellany, (Rule of St. Benedict, Martyrology, etc.), 10th century
MS 183; Bede, Lives of St. Cuthbert and Genealogies, 10th century
MS 198; Anglo-Saxon Homilies, 11th century
MS 326; Aldhelm, De virginitate, 10th century
MS 389; Vita S. Pauli Eremitae and Felix, Vita S. Guthlaci, 10th century
MS 411; Psalter, 10th century
MS 421 (pp. 1, 2); Anglo-Saxon Homilies, 11th century
MS 422 (pp. 27–586); Red Book of Darley
Pembroke College
MS 301; Gospel Book, 11th century
MS 302; Gospel Book, or Hereford Gospels, c. 1060
Trinity College
MS B. 10. 4 (215); Trinity Gospels, 11th century
MS B. 11. 2 (241); Amalarius, De ecclesiasticus officiis, 10th century
MS B. 14. 3 (289); Arator, Historia apostolica, 10th century
MS B. 15. 34 (369); Homilies in Anglo-Saxon, 11th century
MS B. 16. 3 (379); Rabanus Maurus, De laude crucis, 10th century
MS O. 1. 18 (1042); Enchiridion Augustini, 10th century
MS O. 2. 31 (1135); Miscellany (Prosper, Cato, etc.), 10th century
MS O. 3. 7 (1179); Boethius, De consolatione philosophiae, 10th century
University Library
MS Ff. I. 23; Psalter, 11th century
Copenhagen
Royal Library
G.K.S. 10, 2°; Copenhagen Gospels, 11th century
Damme, Belgium
Musée van Maerlant
s.n.; Gospel Lectionary fragment, s.n., 11th century
Durham
Cathedral Library
MS A IV 19; Collectar (Durham Ritual), 10th century
MS B III 32; Hymnal and Aelfric, Grammar, 11th century
Florence
Biblioteca Mediceo Laurenziana
MS Plut. XVII. 20; Gospel Lectionary, 11th century
Hanover
Kestner-Museum
WM XXIa 36; Eadui Codex, 11th century
Leiden
Rijksuniversiteit
Cod. Scaligeranus 69; Aethici Istrici Cosmographia, 10th century
London
British Library
Add MS 24199, part 1; Miscellany (Prudentius, Psychomachia), 10th century
Add MS 34890; Grimbald Gospels
Add MS 37517; 
Add MS 40618; Gospel Book, 10th-century additions to 8th-/9th-century manuscript
Add MS 47967; Tollemach Orosius, (Anglo-Saxon translation) 10th century
Add MS 49598; Benedictional of St. Æthelwold, 10th century
Arundel MS 60; Psalter (with Anglo-Saxon interlinear gloss), 11th century
Arundel MS 155; Psalter (with interlinear Anglo-Saxon translations), 11th century
Cotton Caligula MS A VII (ff. 11–176); Heliand, 10th century
Cotton Caligula MS A XIV (ff. 1–92); Hereford Troper, 11th century
Cotton Caligula MS A XV; Miscellany
Cotton Claudius MS B IV; Old English Illustrated Hexateuch, early 11th century
Cotton Cleopatra MS A VI (ff. 2–53); Miscellany (Grammatical treatises, etc.), 10th century
Cotton Cleopatra MS C VIII; Prudentius, Psychomachia, 10th century
Cotton Galba MS A XVIII; Aethelstan Psalter, 10th century (see also: Oxford, Bodleian Library; MS Rawl. B 484)
Cotton Julius MS A VI; Calendar and Hymnal, 11th century
MS Cotton Otho B II; Gregory the Great, Pastoral Care; 11th century
MS Cotton Tiberius A III; Miscellany, 11th century
Cotton Tiberius MS B I; Orosius (King Alfred's translation), 11th century
Cotton Tiberius MS B V (Vol. 1); Miscellany, 11th century
Cotton Tiberius MS C VI; Psalter, 11th century
Cotton Titus MS D XXVI and D. XXVII; Miscellany, 11th century
Cotton Vespasian MS A. VIII (ff. 2v–33v); New Minster Charter, 10th century
Cotton Vitellius MS A XV; Nowell Codex (Beowulf manuscript), 10th century
Cotton Vitellius MS A XIX; Bede, Lives of St. Cuthbert
Cotton Vitellius MS C III; Herbal, 11th century
Harley MS 76 Bury Gospels
Harley MS 110; Miscellany (Prosper, Isidore, etc.), 10th century
Harley MS 603; Psalter, 11th century
Harley MS 1117 (ff. 2–42v, 45–62v); Bede, Lives of St. Cuthbert, 10th century
Harley MS 2506; Cicero, Aratea], 10th century
Harley MS 2904; Psalter], 10th Century
Harley MS 5431 (ff. 6–126); Miscellany (Regula S. Benedicti, Statua antiqua, etc.), 10th century
Loan MS 11, Kederminster Gospels, 11th century
Royal MS 1 D IX; Gospel Book, 11th century
Royal MS 1 E VI; Gospel Book, 11th century
Royal MS 1 E VII (f. 1v); Bible, 11th century
Royal MS 5 E XI; Aldhelm, De virginitate, 10th century
Royal MS 5 F III; Aldhelm, De virginitate, 10th century
Royal MS 6 A VI; Aldhelm, De virginitate, 10th century
Royal MS 6 A VII; Life of St. Gregory, 11th century
Royal MS 6 B VIII (ff. 1–26); Isidore, De fide catholica, 11th century
Royal MS 7 D XXIV; Aldhem, De virginitate and Epistola Aldhelmi, 10th century
Royal MS 12 C XXIII; Miscellany (Julian, Aldhelm, etc.), 10th century
Royal MS 15 A XVI (f. 84); Miscellany, 9–10th century, 11th century drawing
Royal MS 15 B XIX; Sedulius, Poems, 10th century
Stowe MS 2; Psalter, 11th century
Stowe MS 944; New Minster Register (Liber Vitae), 11th century
College of Arms
Arundel MS 22 (ff. 84–85v); Gospel Lectionary fragment, 10th century
Lambeth Palace Library
MS 200 (Part II); Aldhelm, De virginitate, 10th century
MS 204; Gregory the Great, Dialogues; Ephram, 11th century
Monte Cassino
Archivo della Badia
MS BB. 437, 439; Gospel Book, 11th century
Munich
Staatsbibliothek
CLM. 29031b; Prudentius, Psychomachia, 10th century
New York
Pierpont Morgan Library
M. 33; Gospel Book, 11th century
MS 708; Gospel Book, 11th Century
MS 709; Gospel Book, 11th Century
MS 827; Anhalt-Morgan Gospels, 11th century
MS 869; Arenburg Gospels, 10th century
Orléans
Bibliothèque Municipale
MS 105; Winchcombe Sacramentary, 10th century
MS 175; St. Gregory, Homilies on Eziekiel, 10th century
Oxford
Bodleian Library
MS Auct. F. 1. 15 (S.C. 2455); Boethius, De consolatione philosophiae, 10th century
MS Auct. F. 4. 32 (S.C. 2176); St. Dunstan's Classbook, 9th–10th century
MS Bodley 49 (S.C. 1946); Aldhem, De virginitate, 10th century
MS Bodley 155 (S.C. 1974); Gospel Book, 11th century
MS Bodley 340, 342 (S.C. 2404–5); Homiliary, 11th century
MS Bodley 577 (S.C. 27645); Aldhelm, De virginitate, 11th century
MS Bodley 579 (S.C. 2675); Leofric Missal, 10th-century additions to 9th-century manuscript
MS Bodley 708 (S.C. 2609); Gregory the Great, Pastoral Care, 11th century
MS Bodley 718 (S.C. 2632); Penitential of Egbert, Collectio canonum quadripartita, 11th century
MS Douce 296 (S.C. 21870); Psalter, 11th century
MS Digby 146; Aldhelm, De virginitate, 10th century
MS Hatton 20 (S.C. 4113); Gregory the Great, Pastoral Care, King Alfred's West Saxon version, 9th century
MS Junius 11 (S.C. 5123); Caedmon manuscript
MS Junius 27 (S.C. 5139); Junius Psalter, 10th century
MS Lat. lit. F. 5 (S.C. 29744); St. Margaret Gospels, 11th century
MS Rawl. B 484, f. 85; Aethelstan Psalter (see also: British Library, MS Cotton Galba A XVIII)
MS Rawl. C. 570; Arator, Historia apostolica, 10th century
MS Tanner 3; Gregory the Great, Dialogues, 11th century
MS Tanner 10 (S.C. 27694); Bede, Historia ecclesiastica in Old English version, 10th century
Oriel College
MS 3; Miscellany (Prudentius, Peristephanon, etc.), 10th century
St. John's College
MS 28; Miscellany and Gregory the Great, Pastoral Care, 10th century
MS 194 (f. 1v); Gospel Book, 10th-century drawing in 9th-century manuscript
Paris
Bibliothèque Sainte-Geneviève
MS 2410; Miscellany (Iuvencus, Sedulius, etc.), 11th century
Bibliothèque Nationale
MS lat. 640 A; Boethius, De consolatione philosophiae, 10th century
MS lat. 943; Sherborne Pontifical, 10th century
MS lat. 987; Benedictional, 10th century
MS lat. 6401; Boethius, De consolatione philosophiae, 10th century
MS lat. 7585; Isidor, Ethymologia, 10th century
MS lat. 8824; Psalter, 11th century. Link to color scan
MS lat. 17814; Boethius, De consolatione philosophiae, 10th century
Rheims
Bibliothèque Municipale
MS 9; Gospel Book, 11th century
Rouen
Bibliothèque Municipale
MS A. 27 (368); Lanalet Pontifical, 11th century
Salisbury
Cathedral Library
MS 38; Aldhelm, De virginitate, 10th century
MS 150; Psalter, 10th century
Vatican
Biblioteca Apostolica
MS Reg. lat. 12; Bury Psalter
MS Reg. lat. 1671; Virgil, Works, 10th century
Vercelli
Cathedral
Codex CVII; Homilies and poems in Anglo-Saxon, 10th century
Warsaw
Biblioteka Narodowa
MS I. 3311; Evangeliary and Lectionary, 11th century
York
York Minster, Chapter Library
MS Add. 1; York Gospels, 11th century

Further reading

Temple, Elzbieta. Anglo-Saxon Manuscripts: 900–1066. London; Harvey Miller, 1976.

References

Anglo-Saxon manuscripts